Sébastien Pérez (born 24 November 1973) is a French former professional footballer who played as a defender.

Career
Pérez was born in Saint-Chamond, Loire. He began his career with AS Saint-Étienne and SC Bastia.

In July 1998 Pérez signed for Blackburn Rovers, managed by Roy Hodgson at the time, from Bastia for a fee of £3 million. His stay in East Lancashire was somewhat short, and he only made five appearances for Blackburn. He did, however, manage to score twice for the club; against Chelsea in the league (a game in which he was also sent off) and Lyon in the UEFA Cup. His career with Blackburn started well, but he suffered a serious injury, and upon return to the squad he struggled regaining his place back in the starting lineup. He was then loaned out to former side Bastia.

In June 1999 Pérez completed a move back to France, where he joined Marseille. He was loaned out to Galatasaray for the 2001–02 season, then returned to Marseille until the end of the 2003–04 season, when he was released. He joined FC Istres.

Pérez is also a member of the France national beach soccer team.

Honours
Galatasaray
Süper Lig: 2001–02

France Beach
FIFA Beach Soccer World Cup: 2005

References

External links

1973 births
Living people
People from Saint-Chamond
Sportspeople from Loire (department)
French footballers
Association football defenders
AS Saint-Étienne players
SC Bastia players
Blackburn Rovers F.C. players
Olympique de Marseille players
Galatasaray S.K. footballers
FC Istres players
French expatriate footballers
Premier League players
Süper Lig players
Ligue 1 players
Ligue 2 players
Expatriate footballers in England
Expatriate footballers in Turkey
French people of Spanish descent
French expatriate sportspeople in Turkey
French beach soccer players
Footballers from Auvergne-Rhône-Alpes